Kaleidoscope is a 1971 album by Nancy Wilson. It was released in conjunction with her 1971 Caesars Palace engagement with Harry Belafonte.

Track listing 
 "The Greatest Performance of My Life" (S. Anderle, R. E. Allen) – 3:19
 "If I Were Your Woman" (C. McMurray, L. Ware, P. Sawyer) – 3:04
 "I'll Get Along Somehow" (B. Fields, G. Marks) – 5:28
 "Middle of the Road" (Reuben Brown) – 2:18
 "Let It Be Me" (G. Becaud, M. Curtis, P. Delanoe) – 4:29
 "To Be The One You Love" (N. Newell, S. Cipriani) – 2:15
 "Mr. Bojangles" (Jerry Jeff Walker) – 6:06
 "Ain't No Sunshine" (Bill Withers) – 2:19
 "Everyone Knows" (Reuben Brown) – 2:20
 "Once in My Lifetime" (J. Sharpe, L. Henrique) – 4:02

Personnel 
 Nancy Wilson – vocals, associate producer
 James Mack – conductor, tracks A1, A3, A4, A5, B1, B2, B4, B5
 Phil Wright – conductor, tracks A2, B3
 David Cavanuagh – producer
 Neil Brisker – photographer

References 

1971 albums
Nancy Wilson (jazz singer) albums
Albums produced by Dave Cavanaugh
Capitol Records albums